Žďár nad Sázavou District is a district in the Vysočina Region of the Czech Republic. Its capital is the town of Žďár nad Sázavou.

Administrative division
Žďár nad Sázavou District is divided into four administrative districts of municipalities with extended competence: Žďár nad Sázavou, Bystřice nad Pernštejnem, Nové Město na Moravě and Velké Meziříčí.

List of municipalities
Towns are marked in bold and market towns in italics:

Baliny - 
Blažkov - 
Blízkov - 
Bobrová - 
Bobrůvka - 
Bohdalec - 
Bohdalov - 
Bohuňov - 
Borovnice - 
Bory - 
Březejc - 
Březí nad Oslavou - 
Březí - 
Březské - 
Budeč - 
Bukov - 
Býšovec - 
Bystřice nad Pernštejnem - 
Černá - 
Chlumek - 
Chlumětín - 
Chlum-Korouhvice - 
Cikháj - 
Dalečín - 
Daňkovice - 
Dlouhé - 
Dobrá Voda - 
Dolní Heřmanice - 
Dolní Libochová - 
Dolní Rožínka - 
Fryšava pod Žákovou horou - 
Hamry nad Sázavou - 
Herálec - 
Heřmanov - 
Hodíškov - 
Horní Libochová - 
Horní Radslavice - 
Horní Rožínka - 
Jabloňov - 
Jámy - 
Javorek - 
Jimramov - 
Jívoví - 
Kadolec - 
Kadov - 
Karlov - 
Kněževes - 
Koroužné - 
Kotlasy - 
Kozlov - 
Krásné - 
Krásněves - 
Křídla - 
Křižánky - 
Křižanov - 
Křoví - 
Kuklík - 
Kundratice - 
Kyjov - 
Lavičky - 
Lhotka - 
Lísek - 
Líšná - 
Malá Losenice - 
Martinice - 
Matějov - 
Měřín -
Meziříčko - 
Milasín - 
Milešín - 
Mirošov - 
Moravec - 
Moravecké Pavlovice - 
Netín - 
Nížkov - 
Nová Ves - 
Nová Ves u Nového Města na Moravě - 
Nové Dvory - 
Nové Město na Moravě - 
Nové Sady - 
Nové Veselí - 
Nový Jimramov - 
Nyklovice - 
Obyčtov - 
Ořechov - 
Oslavice - 
Osová Bítýška - 
Osové - 
Ostrov nad Oslavou - 
Otín - 
Pavlínov - 
Pavlov - 
Petráveč - 
Pikárec - 
Písečné - 
Počítky - 
Poděšín - 
Podolí - 
Pokojov - 
Polnička - 
Prosetín - 
Račice - 
Račín - 
Radenice - 
Radešín - 
Radešínská Svratka - 
Radkov - 
Radňoves - 
Radňovice - 
Radostín nad Oslavou - 
Radostín - 
Řečice - 
Rodkov - 
Rosička - 
Rousměrov - 
Rovečné - 
Rožná - 
Rozseč - 
Rozsochy - 
Ruda - 
Rudolec - 
Sázava - 
Sazomín - 
Sejřek - 
Sirákov - 
Sklené - 
Sklené nad Oslavou - 
Skorotice - 
Škrdlovice - 
Skřinářov - 
Sněžné - 
Spělkov - 
Štěpánov nad Svratkou -
Strachujov - 
Stránecká Zhoř - 
Strážek - 
Střítež - 
Sulkovec - 
Světnov - 
Sviny - 
Svratka - 
Tasov - 
Tři Studně - 
Ubušínek - 
Uhřínov - 
Ujčov - 
Újezd - 
Unčín - 
Vatín - 
Věchnov - 
Věcov - 
Velká Bíteš - 
Velká Losenice - 
Velké Janovice - 
Velké Meziříčí - 
Velké Tresné - 
Vepřová - 
Věstín - 
Věžná - 
Vídeň - 
Vidonín - 
Vír - 
Vlachovice - 
Vlkov - 
Vojnův Městec - 
Vysoké -
Záblatí - 
Zadní Zhořec - 
Ždánice -
Žďár nad Sázavou - 
Znětínek - 
Zubří - 
Zvole

Geography

The landscape is rugged and diverse, with above-average elevations compared to the rest of the country. The territory extends into three geomorphological mesoregions: Křižanov Highlands (most of the territory), Upper Svratka Highlands (north and east) and Upper Sázava Hills (smalls part in the west).

There are several important rivers, which spring here (in the area of Žďárské vrchy) and drain the territory. The Sázava flows through the north and west. The Svratka springs near the Sázava and flows through the north and east. The Oslava flows through the central part of the district to the south. Other notable watercourses are Bobrůvka and Balinka.

The territory is rich in bodies of water. The largest body of water is Vír I Reservoir. The largest pond is Velké Dářko, which is also the largest pond of the whole Vysočina Region.

Žďárské vrchy is the only protected landscape area in the district. It covers the northern part of the district.

Demographics

Most populated municipalities

Economy
The largest employers with its headquarters in Žďár nad Sázavou District and at least 500 employers are:

Transport
The D1 motorway from Prague to Brno passes through the southern part of the district.

Sights

The pilgrimage Church of Saint John of Nepomuk in Žďár nad Sázavou was designated a UNESCO World Heritage Site in 1994 because of its unique architectural style, created by architect Jan Santini Aichel. It is the most important monument in the district and also the only monument protected as a national cultural monument.

The best-preserved settlements, protected as monument reservations and monument zones, are:
Krátká (monument reservation)
Křižánky (monument reservation)
Jimramov
Nové Město na Moravě
Velká Bíteš
Velké Meziříčí
Ubušínek

The most visited tourist destinations are the Šikland western town in Zvole, Mining Museum in Nové Město na Moravě, Žďár nad Sázavou Castle, and Eden Centrum amusement park in Bystřice nad Pernštejnem.

References

External links

Žďár nad Sázavou District profile on the Czech Statistical Office's website

 
Districts of the Czech Republic